Prisma or PRISMA may refer to:

Media
 Prisma (album), 2019 album by Beret
 Prisma (magazine), 1930s Catalan magazine
 Prisma (typeface), a typeface designed by Rudolf Koch
 Prisma (app), a photo editing software
 Prisma+, a Greek television channel
 Prisma (TV series), Amazon Prime Video's Italian television series.

Organisations
 Prisma (chain store), a Finnish hypermarket chain, part of S Group
 Prisma Energy International, an American company
 Prisma Presse, a French publisher, subsidiary of Gruner + Jahr

Outer space
 Prisma (satellite project), a Swedish satellite project.
 PRISMA (spacecraft), an Italian space project
 1192 Prisma, a minor planet

Other uses
 Chevrolet Prisma (disambiguation), two models of sedan car
 Preferred Reporting Items for Systematic Reviews and Meta-Analyses, standard for the reporting of systematic reviews and meta-analyses of research

See also
 Prism (disambiguation), which translates as "prisma" in several languages, including Swedish, Greek, German, Italian, Dutch, Spanish and Portuguese
 Prizma, a color motion picture process
 HK Prizma Riga, a Latvian ice hockey team